Ramón Francisco Urías Figueroa (born June 3, 1994) is a Mexican professional baseball infielder for the Baltimore Orioles of Major League Baseball (MLB). He made his MLB debut in 2020.

Career

Texas Rangers
Urías signed with the Texas Rangers as an international free agent in December 2010. He made his professional debut in 2011 with the Dominican Summer League Rangers, batting .213 with one home run and 13 RBIs over 49 games. In 2012, he returned to the DSL where he batted .268/.346/.342 with one home run and 36 RBIs in 56 games.

Diablos Rojos del México
In 2013, the Rangers loaned him to Diablos Rojos del México of the Mexican League, where he played from 2013 to 2017. In 2017, he slashed .340/.433/.577 with 19 home runs and 79 RBIs over 106 games.

St. Louis Cardinals
Following the season, he signed a minor league contract with the St. Louis Cardinals.

Urías began the 2018 season with the Springfield Cardinals before being promoted to the Memphis Redbirds. In 90 games between the two clubs, he hit .300/.356/.516 with 13 home runs and 44 RBIs. The Cardinals added him to their 40-man roster after the 2018 season.

Urías returned to Memphis to begin 2019, and also spent time with Springfield and the Palm Beach Cardinals. Over 103 games between both teams, he batted .262 with 10 home runs and 55 RBIs.

Urías was designated for assignment by the Cardinals on February 6, 2020.

Baltimore Orioles
Urías was claimed off waivers by the Baltimore Orioles on February 11, 2020. On August 18, 2020, Urías was promoted to MLB for the first time. Urías made his major league debut on August 20 against the Boston Red Sox, striking out in his only plate appearance. In 25 at-bats in his rookie season for the Orioles, Urías slashed .360/.407/.560 with a home run and three RBI. In 2021, Urías appeared in 262 at-bats for the Orioles and bat .279/.361/.412 with seven home runs and 38 RBIs. 

Urías became the team's' primary third baseman for the 2022 season. In 403 at-bats, he slashed .248/.305/.414 with 16 home runs and 51 RBIs. Urías managed a 3.6WAR for 2022, and hit his first career triple on September 27th against the Boston Red Sox. In the same game, Urías hit 3-for-3 and was on track to hit for the cycle for the first time in his career before exiting the game on a knee sprain injury that placed him on the 10-day IL and ended his season early. Urías won the Gold Glove Award for American League third basemen.

Personal life 
He is the older brother of Luis Urías, also an MLB infielder.

References

External links

1994 births
Living people
Águilas de Mexicali players
Baltimore Orioles players
Baseball players from Sonora
Cañeros de Los Mochis players
Dominican Summer League Rangers players
Mexican expatriate baseball players in the Dominican Republic
Diablos Rojos del México players
Gold Glove Award winners
Major League Baseball players from Mexico
Major League Baseball second basemen
Memphis Redbirds players
Mexican expatriate baseball players in the United States
Mexican League baseball second basemen
Mexican League baseball shortstops
Mexican League baseball third basemen
Norfolk Tides players
Palm Beach Cardinals players
People from Magdalena de Kino
Springfield Cardinals players